Hakea francisiana, commonly called the emu tree, grass-leaf hakea or bottlebrush hakea, is a shrub or tree of the genus Hakea native to Western Australia and South Australia.

Description
It blooms from July to October and produces pink-red flowers. The flowers occur in the leaf axils during winter and spring. The colour of the flowers is red or reddish purple but the type that was once known as H.coriacea is mostly cream flowered with a pink middle. The pods will shed the seeds in particular conditions such as following a bushfire. It is very similar to Hakea bucculenta and Hakea multilineata.

Taxonomy
The species was first formally described by the botanist Ferdinand von Mueller in 1858 as part of the work Fragmenta Phytographiae Australiae. The only synonyms are Hakea grammatophylla, Hakea coriacea, Hakea multilineata, Hakea multilineata var. graminea and Hakea multilineata var. grammatophylla.
 
The specific epithet honours George William Francis, who was the first director of the Adelaide Botanic Garden, from 1857 to 1865.

Distribution
It is endemic to an area in the Wheatbelt, Mid West and Goldfields-Esperance  regions of Western Australia from Geraldton in the west to Wiluna in the north to Lake Grace in the south and the Great Victoria Desert in the east extending into western parts of South Australia where it is found on sand-plains growing in sandy-clay, loam or clay soils often with gravel and quartz present. It is usually part of mallee woodland and shrubland communities.

Cultivation
It requires a full sun position and needs minimal watering. It is useful as an ornamental or as habitat for birds and bees. The plant is tolerant of drought, lime and moderate to light frost. It is sometimes grafted onto hardier rootstock.

References

francisiana
Eudicots of Western Australia
Taxa named by Ferdinand von Mueller
Plants described in 1858
Flora of South Australia